= Isle Galet Formation =

- Stratigraphic range: Early Ordovician – Late Ordovician
- Type: Formation
- Unit of: Baie d'Espoir Group

Lithology
- Primary: Felsic marine volcanics

Location
- Region: Newfoundland
- Country: Canada
- Occurrence of the Isle Galet Formation in southeastern Newfoundland

The Isle Galet Formation is a formation cropping out in Newfoundland.
